Sholas are patches of tropical montane forest in South India. Shola may also refer to
Shola (name)
Shola (album) by the Pakistani pop music group Awaz
Sholapith or shola pith, a dried spongey plant matter
Shola-e Javid, a defunct Maoist political party founded around 1964 in Afghanistan
Shola Shopping Center in Riyadh, Saudi Arabi

See also
Sholay, 1975 Indian film